Yelena Sinkevich (born 16 May 1971) is a Belarusian cross-country skier. She competed at the 1994 Winter Olympics and the 1998 Winter Olympics.

References

External links
 

1971 births
Living people
Belarusian female cross-country skiers
Olympic cross-country skiers of Belarus
Cross-country skiers at the 1994 Winter Olympics
Cross-country skiers at the 1998 Winter Olympics
Sportspeople from Minsk